= Irkutsk New Airport =

Former planned airport in Irkutsk, Russia

Coordinates: 52°28′14″N 104°32′04″E

Irkutsk New Airport was a planned I class new international airport 24 km (15 mi) to northeast from Irkutsk, near Pozdnyakova village. Construction was planned to begin in 2010 and end in 2015, with the airport going into operation in 2016.

The plan was postponed indefinitely in 2010 due to a lack of interest from investors.
